The Newman Shame is a 1977 Australian television film starring George Lazenby and produced by Robert Bruning who previously worked together on Is There Anybody There? (1976). Bruning made it for his Gemini Productions, which was owned by Reg Grundy Productions.

Synopsis
John Brandy is an ex-cop on holiday in Singapore with his girlfriend Ginger and their friend Betty Newman when Betty's husband, Frank, calls them just before the latter commits suicide.

The three of them return to Perth where Betty is told Frank starred in a pornographic movie. Betty asks John to investigate what happened.

John discovers that Newman killed himself after being drugged at a party and found himself in a pornographic film; he was blackmailed and embezzled money to pay off his tormentors, but when the film was distributed anyway he decided to take his own life.

Cast
George Lazenby as John Brandy
Diane Craig as Ginger
Joan Bruce as Betty Newman
Ken Goodlet as Frank Newman
Alwyn Kurts as Steven Ogilvie
 Judy Nunn as Veronica
Terry Willesee

Production
Most of Bruning's films for Gemini Productions were filmed in Sydney but The Newman Shame was made in Perth with some finance from Swan TV. There was also some location work in Singapore.

Lazenby made two films in Australia, The Man from Hong Kong and Is There Anybody There? as well as appearing on TV shows. He then relocated to the US but returned temporarily to Australia to make The Newman Shame.

Joan Bruce called Lazenby "the most  man I have ever had the displeasure to work with."

References

External links

The Newman Shame at Oz Movies

The Newman Shame at Screen Australia
The Newman Shame at AustLit (subscription required)
The Newman Shame at National Film and Sound Archive

Australian television films
1977 television films
1977 films
Films directed by Julian Pringle
1970s English-language films